St. Timothy is a Roman Catholic secondary school located in Cochrane, Alberta, Canada. Founded in 2004, the school enrolls 400 to 500 students from grades 7 through 12. The school is named after St. Timothy, a bishop of Ephesus and is home to the sports team, the Thunder. The school falls under the jurisdiction of the Calgary Catholic School District.

References

High schools in Alberta
Catholic secondary schools in Alberta
Educational institutions established in 2004
2004 establishments in Alberta